Jonathan Guy Laurence (born 23 November 1961) is an English businessman, who is currently the Chief Executive of Premier League club Chelsea. He has previously served as Chief Executive of Vodafone UK, and most recently President and CEO of Rogers Communications.

Early life
He was born in Manchester. He went to King's School Macclesfield, Cheshire.

He attended Teesside Polytechnic, now Teesside University, beginning in 1992.

Career

Vodafone
He joined Vodafone in 2000. From 2002 to 2005 he was Chief Executive of Vizavvi (Vodafone live!). In 2005, he became Chief Executive of Vodafone Netherlands. He became Chief Executive of Vodafone UK in 2008.

Rogers Communications
Laurence served as President and CEO of Rogers Communications from 2 December 2013 to 17 October 2016, succeeding Nadir Mohamed who had retired after his 5-year contract expired. Rogers is the largest mobile and cable operator in Canada and second largest media owner. They also own the Toronto Blue Jays and Sportsnet, the largest sports TV network who paid $5.2bn for the NHL sport rights in 2013.

During his tenure, Rogers beat out Telus to acquire Mobilicity.

However, Laurence was ousted on 17 October 2016, due to a feud with the Rogers family who have four board seats and control Rogers Communications though voting shares.

Maple Leaf Sports & Entertainment 
Laurence served as a Director of the MLSE, the largest sports company in Canada and one of the largest in North America from 2013 to 2016. MLSE owns The Toronto Maple Leafs, The Toronto Raptors, Toronto Football Club, and the Toronto Marlies.

Chelsea

On 11 January 2018, Laurence was appointed as Chief Executive of Premier League club Chelsea.

Personal life
He is married with three daughters and lives in Buckinghamshire.

References

1961 births
British telecommunications industry businesspeople
Businesspeople from Manchester
Vodafone people
Living people